XFR may refer to:

 Jaguar XFR, an executive/mid-size luxury car
 eXtended Frequency Range, auto-overclocking feature of AMD Ryzen microprocessors
 X-Force Red, an IBM global team that provides security testing services
 X-ray fluorescence, "secondary" emission of X-rays from material bombarded with high-energy X-rays or gamma rays
 XFR, a tech company that provides IT Infrastructure and Financial Services